Carole "Kelly" Bishop (born February 28, 1944) is an American actress and dancer, best known for her roles as matriarch Emily Gilmore on the series Gilmore Girls and as Marjorie Houseman, the mother of Jennifer Grey's Frances "Baby" Houseman in the film Dirty Dancing. Bishop originated the role of Sheila in A Chorus Line, for which she won a Tony Award for Best Performance by a Featured Actress in a Musical. She also starred as Fanny Flowers in the ABC Family short-lived comedy-drama series Bunheads and is currently starring as Mrs. Ivey in The Watchful Eye (2023).

Early life
Bishop was born on February 28, 1944, in Colorado Springs, Colorado, to Jane Lenore (née Wahtola) and Lawrence Boden Bishop. She grew up in Denver, Colorado, where she trained to be a ballet dancer, attending the San Jose Ballet School. At 18, she headed to New York City and landed her first job dancing in a year-round ballet company at Radio City Music Hall. Bishop continued to dance in Las Vegas, summer stock and on television until she was cast in 1967 in Golden Rainbow, her first Broadway role.

Career
Bishop's big break came when she was cast as the sexy, hard-edged Sheila in the 1975 Broadway production of A Chorus Line, for which she won the 1976 Tony Award as "Best Supporting or Featured Actress (Musical)" as well as the 1976 Drama Desk Award for "Outstanding Actress in a Musical". She was also cast in Broadway productions of Six Degrees of Separation, Neil Simon's Proposals, the Tony Award-winning The Last Night of Ballyhoo and Bus Stop.

In film, she was cast opposite to Jill Clayburgh in Paul Mazursky's big-screen drama An Unmarried Woman (1978). In the 1987 film Dirty Dancing, she was originally set for a small role, but took on the much bigger role of Mrs. Houseman when Lynne Lipton, the original actor, fell ill during the first week of shooting.

Bishop went on to play a "mom" to high-profile stars in features: Howard Stern's in the Betty Thomas-directed comedy Private Parts (1997), and Tobey Maguire's in Wonder Boys (2000). Additional feature credits include Ich und Er (USA: Me and Him, 1988), Queens Logic (1991), Café Society (1995), Miami Rhapsody (1995) and Blue Moon (2002). On television, Bishop starred in the Mike Nichols' The Thorns opposite Tony Roberts and Marilyn Cooper in 1988. She played Lisa Ann Walter's mother on My Wildest Dreams (1995). She has guest-starred on Kate & Allie, Law & Order, Law & Order: Special Victims Unit and Murphy Brown.

From 2000 to 2007, Bishop starred in The WB/CW series Gilmore Girls as wealthy New England matriarch Emily Gilmore. She reprised her role in the 2016 miniseries Gilmore Girls: A Year in the Life on Netflix. She would later reunite with Amy Sherman-Palladino, the show's creator, on the ABC Family show Bunheads, which aired from 2012 to 2013 and was cancelled after the first season. 

Following the end of Gilmore Girls, Bishop returned to theater, performing in Becky Shaw at the Second Stage Theatre in 2008 and briefly as the character Evangeline Harcourt in the 2011 revival of Anything Goes alongside Sutton Foster and Joel Grey, as well as appearing in the 2011 movie Friends with Kids. Bishop has also since had one episode appearances and recurring guest roles in shows like Army Wives, Mercy, The Good Wife and playing Benedetta in the Golden Globe winning series The Marvelous Mrs. Maisel, in which she once again reunited with Gilmore Girls show creator Amy Sherman-Palladino.

Bishop currently stars in the TV drama series The Watchful Eye as Mrs. Ivey, which premiered on January 30, 2023.

Personal life
Bishop resides in South Orange, New Jersey. She was married to the TV talk show host Lee Leonard until his death in 2018.

Credits

Film

Television

Theater

References

External links 
 
 
 
 
 Kelly Bishop cast bio on The CW

American female dancers
Dancers from New Jersey
American film actresses
American television actresses
Actresses from Denver
Actresses from New Jersey
Jacqueline Kennedy Onassis School alumni
Drama Desk Award winners
Actresses from Boulder, Colorado
Actresses from Colorado Springs, Colorado
People from South Orange, New Jersey
Theatre World Award winners
Tony Award winners
Living people
American stage actresses
20th-century American actresses
21st-century American actresses
Dancers from Colorado
1944 births